Tappan Spring is a spring located in Tappan Spring Canyon in Coconino County, Arizona. Basalt rocks of Tappan age are named after flows from cinder cones north of the spring. Tappan-age rocks are from the period 0.2 to 0.7 myr.

References

External links
 
 

Middle Pleistocene
Geology of Arizona